Frank Perkins Whitman (1853–1919), was an American physicist

Biography
Whitman was born in Troy, New York on July 29, 1853. He was graduated at Brown University in 1874 and took his A.M. there in 1877, later studying at Johns Hopkins University. He was professor of physics at Rensselaer Polytechnic Institute, Troy, in 1880–1886, and from 1886 occupied the same position at the Western Reserve University. He was a contributor to scientific periodicals.

Notes

References

1853 births
1919 deaths
People from Troy, New York
Brown University alumni
Johns Hopkins University alumni
Rensselaer Polytechnic Institute faculty
Case Western Reserve University faculty
Scientists from New York (state)